Kiss Me, Kiss Me, Kiss Me is the seventh studio album by English rock band the Cure, released on 26 May 1987 by Fiction Records.

The album helped bring the Cure into the American mainstream, becoming the band's first album to reach the top 40 of the Billboard 200 chart and achieving platinum certification. Like its predecessor, The Head on the Door, it was also a great international success, reaching the top 10 in numerous countries.

In 2000, the album was voted number 256 in Colin Larkin's All Time Top 1000 Albums.

Production and content

Kiss Me Kiss Me Kiss Me is the last Cure studio album upon which Porl Thompson played keyboards; he played only guitar on all subsequent studio releases. Special guest Andrew Brennan played the saxophone on "Hey You!!!" and "Icing Sugar". The album was recorded at Studio Miraval in Correns, France.

Release
Kiss Me Kiss Me Kiss Me was released on 26 May 1987 by the Fiction label in the UK and by Elektra in the US and Canada. Though a double album, it was released as a single CD and single cassette. One track, "Hey You!!!", was omitted from the original CD release because of the 74:33 Red Book CD time restriction, but was included on all cassette releases. A limited vinyl edition came with an extra six-track 12" orange vinyl featuring the songs "Sugar Girl", "Snow in Summer", "Icing Sugar" (Weird Remix), "A Japanese Dream", "Breathe" and "A Chain of Flowers".

The album was re-released in August 2006, including "Hey You!!!" on the first disc, a song that had been omitted from the original CD issue. The second disc is composed of demos and live versions of the songs on the first disc, including a recording of "Why Can't I Be You?" from the final show of the Kissing Tour at the Wembley Arena. It was released on 8 August 2006 in the U.S. and on 14 August 2006 in the UK. Robert Smith stated on his website that there were so many missing tracks that he made three discs, the third containing alternate tracks of the album's songs. However, after discussing with family and friends, he decided that the first two discs were better choices for release. Smith said that it was possible that the other disc may surface as a leak or in a future release.

Track listing

Personnel
The Cure

Robert Smith – guitar, keyboards, vocals, recorder on "The Snakepit" and "Like Cockatoos"
Simon Gallup – bass guitar
Porl Thompson – guitar, keyboards, saxophone on "Shiver and Shake"
Lol Tolhurst – keyboards
Boris Williams – drums, percussion
Roger O'Donnell – keyboards on live tracks from the deluxe edition

Guest musician
Andrew Brennen – saxophone on "Icing Sugar" and "Hey You!!!"

Production
David M. Allen, Robert Smith – production
Sean Burrows, Jacques Hermet – assistant production
Bob Clearmountain – remixing for single version of "Just Like Heaven"

Charts

Weekly charts

Year-end charts

Certifications and sales

Notes

References

Bibliography
 

1987 albums
Albums produced by David M. Allen
The Cure albums
Elektra Records albums
Fiction Records albums